Hussain Dawood (born 20 September 1943) is a Pakistani businessman, investor, educationalist and philanthropist. Dawood is the Chairman of two publicly listed companies in Pakistan: the Dawood Hercules Corporation and Engro Corporation.

Dawood is the Chairman of the Dawood Foundation (TDF) which focuses on creating collective change by building interactive spaces for formal and informal learning through projects such as the Dawood Public School in Karachi. He is also the Chairman of the Karachi School of Business & Leadership (KSBL), and a Director of the Islamabad Policy Research Institute.

Early life and education 
Dawood was born in Bombay, British India (now Mumbai) into a Memon family. His father Seth Ahmed Dawood, a noted businessman, moved 1947 with the family to Karachi.

Dawood visited a school in Yorkshire. He studied Metallurgy at the Sheffield University from where he graduated in 1966. He went on to study at the Kellogg School of Management, Northwestern University, and received in 1968 an MBA.

He is married to Kulsum. The couple has four children; Azmeh, Shahzada, Sabrina & Samad.

Career
Hussain Dawood joined after his studies the family business in Pakistan as Group Finance Director. He  became in 1973 Managing Director of Dawood Lawrencepur, a public limited company specialising in textiles. In 1974, he joined the board of the family-run business, conducted significant merger and acquisition activities. In 1981, Dawood became Chief Executive Officer (CEO) of Dawood Hercules Chemicals Limited (the predecessor of Dawood Hercules Corporation).

In the late 1990s, he spearheaded the expansion of the company, including the acquisition of Engro Corporation. Following the death of his father he took over as Chairman of the Board of Dawood Hercules Corporation. In 2006, Dawood became Chairman of the Board of Engro Corporation, which specialises in a variety of industries, including fertilisers, polymers, food and energy. Other notable positions Hussain Dawood has held:
 Chairman of The Hub Power Company, HubCo (until 2018).
 Chairman of Central Insurance (renamed to Cyan Limited)
 Chairman of Inbox Business Technologies
 Director of Pakistan Business Council
 Member of the Board of Beaconhouse National University
 Member of the Advisory Board of Dawood College of Engineering and Technology
 Member of the Advisory Board of Shaukat Khanum Memorial Cancer Hospital & Research Centre.

Dawood has expanded the business interests of his companies and is considered a business pioneer. His experience consists of managing, supervising and controlling family businesses and chairing listed companies. This has involved a number of joint ventures over the years with European, US, Japanese and Chinese parties, such as:
 Royal Vopak, 
 Royal FrieslandCampina, 
 Mitsubishi Corporation and 
 China Machinery Engineering Corporation.

Philanthropy 
Dawood is a philanthropist and has significantly donated to formal education, healthcare, and disaster relief in Pakistan. The Dawood Foundation is a private charitable trust formed in 1960. Hussain Dawood assumed the chairmanship of it in 2000. It operates various schools, other informal education project, and supports the Engro Foundation.

He is the founding donor of the Mariam Dawood School of Visual Arts & Design at the Beaconhouse National University Tarogil Campus, in Lahore. The Dawood Foundation has assisted those affected by the tsunami of 2004, the 2005 earthquake, and the 2010 floods.

Dawood is the Founder & Chairman of the Karachi School of Business & Leadership (KSBL), a graduate management school, focusing on development of effective leaders.

During the COVID-19 pandemic outbreak in Pakistan, he pledged on behalf of the Corporations and his family in April 2020 a remarkable contribution in services, kind, and cash.

Awards and recognition
 Officer of the Order of Merit of the Italian Republic (Ufficiale Ordine al Merito della Repubblica Italiana) (Italy) (2 June 2008).
 Lifetime Achievement Award by the Marketing Association of Pakistan (2016).
 Hilal-i-Imtiaz, Pakistan's third highest civilian award and honour (2018).

References

External links
Dawood Hercules Corporation official website
Hussain Dawood Pledge official website

1943 births
Businesspeople from Karachi
Dawood family
Founders of Pakistani schools and colleges
Kellogg School of Management alumni
Living people
Memon people
Pakistani chief executives
Pakistani company founders
Pakistani educational theorists
Pakistani humanitarians
Pakistani industrialists
Pakistani people of Gujarati descent
Pakistani philanthropists
Recipients of Hilal-i-Imtiaz